New Canaan is a community in the Canadian province of Nova Scotia, located in  Cumberland County .

References
 New Canaan on Destination Nova Scotia

Communities in Cumberland County, Nova Scotia
General Service Areas in Nova Scotia